Marcelo Demoliner was the defending champion, but he lost against Ricardo Mello in the first round.Marcos Daniel won in the final 7–5, 6–7(5), 6–4 against Bastian Knittel.

Seeds

Draw

Finals

Top half

Bottom half

References
Qualifying Singles
Main Draw

Aberto Santa Catarina de Tenis - Singles
2010 Singles